CARMAnation is a website for people to rent out their private parking. Founded by Ilya Movshovich and Ashley Cummings, in January 2013, and headquartered in Silicon Valley, the company is privately owned and operated by Carmanation, Inc.

Users of the site must register and create a personal online profile before using the site. Every parking spot is associated with a host whose profile includes recommendations by other users, reviews by previous guests, as well as a response rating and private messaging system.

The company is also looking into including corporate parking lots that clear out when employees go home after 5 pm.

History

In December 2012, Ilya Movshovich created the initial concept for CARMAnation (at that time calling it Swap-n-park). A few months later Ashley Cummings joined as a co-founder of "Swap-n-park". The company was founded on January 1, 2013.

Name change and growth

In January 2013, the conceptual name "Swap-n-park" was officially changed to CARMAnation and registered under Carmanation, Inc. CARMAnation.com officially launched in Silicon Valley the Bay Area on March 1, 2014.

Company

One year later from the original conception, the founding team headquarters itself in Movshovich’s condominium on Sansome Street in Silicon Valley. As of June 2014 the founding team is self-funding the company, and has started speaking with investors to raise their first seed round to continue the rapid growth in the Bay Area and future expansion into other cities throughout the United States, with a plan to move into its first Silicon Valley office space.

The CARMAnation founding team acts as the key managerial staff for CARMAnation: Ilya Movshovich, Co-Founder and Chief Executive Officer; Ashley Cummings, Co-Founder and Vice President of Communication.

Business model

CARMAnation runs on a marketplace platform model where it connects parking hosts and drivers, and enables transactions without owning any parking spots itself. Such platforms disrupt traditional industries by creating new sources of supply and relying on curation for developing quality.

Operation

CARMAnation is an online marketplace for parking sharing, that connects users with private parking to users looking for parking spaces. Users are categorized as “Parking Hosts” and “Guests;” both of which must register with CARMAnation using a variety of means. A valid email address or Facebook account are the only requirements to build a unique user profile on the website.

CARMAnation facilitates online payments from guest to parking host through Stripe.com which securely processes payment transactions. The company’s revenue comes from a 15% commission of the guest payment. If the parking host offers their parking space free-of-charge, the company charges 30 cents to cover the transaction cost acquired through access to Stripe.com, the rest in full goes into an established bank account of the respective charity.

External links
CARMAnation official site
Parking Space May Be Final Frontier in the Sharing Economy
CARMAnation Tries Its App at Solving Parking Peeves
CARMAnation Tries Its App At Solving Parking Peeves
S.F. City Attorney Orders Cease And Desist for Mobile Parking Apps
How to find a spot AND park for free in SF's worst parking hoods
Could This Startup Help Resolve SF's Parking Pains
The 15 Hottest New Apps at Dublin’s Web Summit
San Francisco bans parking space app

References 

Online marketplaces of the United States
Parking companies